Aliabad-e Olya (also Romanized as ‘Alīābād-e ‘Olyā; also known as ‘Alīābād-e Bālā) is a village in Aliabad Rural District of the Central District of Hashtrud County, East Azerbaijan province, Iran. At the 2006 National Census, its population was 885 in 204 households. The following census in 2011 counted 862 people in 208 households. The latest census in 2016 showed a population of 825 people in 249 households; it was the largest village in its rural district.

References 

Hashtrud County

Populated places in East Azerbaijan Province

Populated places in Hashtrud County